Kristjan Raudsepp (1880 – ?) was an Estonian politician. He was a member of II Riigikogu. He was a member of the Riigikogu since 22 November 1924, representing the Workers' United Front. He replaced Elise Priks.

References

1880 births
Year of death missing
Workers' United Front politicians
Members of the Riigikogu, 1923–1926